Prymorskyi District may refer to the following places in Ukraine:

Prymorskyi District, Mariupol

Prymorskyi District, Zaporizhzhia Oblast